Wrestling at the 2019 Southeast Asian Games was held at the AUF Sports and Cultural Center, Angeles City, Philippines, from 9 to 10 December 2019.

Medal table

Medalists

Men's Greco-Roman

Men's freestyle

Women's freestyle

References

External links
 

2019 Southeast Asian Games events